"Another Lonely Night" is a single by American country music artist Jean Shepard.  Released in November 1970, it was the first and only single for her 1971 album Here and Now.  The song reached #12 on the Billboard Hot Country Singles chart. It was covered the same year by American country music artist Lynn Anderson on her album Rose Garden.

Chart performance

References 

1970 singles
Jean Shepard songs
Songs written by Jan Crutchfield
1970 songs
Capitol Records singles